Guo Jian (born 26 January 1962) is a Chinese Australian artist.  His work has been exhibited and collected in Germany, France, Belgium, Sweden, US, Mexico, Australia, New Zealand, Hong Kong and China, including Musée de Picardie in France, Brussels Art Festival,  the Art Gallery Of New South Wales, the Queensland Gallery of Modern Art (GoMA) and the National Gallery of Australia (NGA).

He has been featured in The New York Times, CNN, The Sydney Morning Herald, the Australian Broadcasting Commission (ABC), Artist Profile magazine and on the cover of The Wall Street Journal Asia Weekend Magazine.

He is part of a movement of contemporary Chinese artists whose work is characterised as Cynical Realism, which began in the 1990s in Beijing.  Born a year after the  Great Leap Forward, his art is heavily influenced by the last fifty years of political upheaval and violence in China, a period that included the Great Proletarian Cultural Revolution in the 1960s and 70s, the Sino Vietnamese war in the early 1980s, and the Tiananmen Square massacre in 1989.

At age seventeen, he enlisted in China’s People’s Liberation Army (PLA) during a recruitment drive to support the Sino-Vietnamese war, initiated by the country’s then leader Deng Xiaoping.

A central theme to Guo Jian’s art derives from his observations of the application of propaganda and the arts to both motivate soldiers and sway public opinion. His perspective comes from his experiences as a propaganda poster painter in the PLA and propaganda officer in a transport company, then later from the outside looking back in as a student demonstrator during the Tiananmen Square protests in the spring of 1989.

His art also explores common themes and approaches in both Chinese propaganda and Western propaganda.

Art and influences
Stylistically, Guo Jian’s work falls within the Cynical Realism grouping that has been attached to many contemporary Chinese artists who draw from their experiences over the last four decades in China. Their work is broadly a response to the dominant government driven form of propaganda-laden art known as Socialist Realism. While studying art at Minzu University of China the 85 New Wave Movement emerged, which also had a profound impact on his work.

Guo Jian’s art focuses on the use of the female celebrity as a model patriot, a tool to motivate, influence, manipulate and ultimately serve as Ulyssean Siren. His work looks at the commonalities between the purity of the Chinese army’s Entertainment Soldier  (文艺兵 Pinyin: wényìbīng or文工团 Pinyin: wéngōngtuán) performers and their Western counterparts. In the book STUDIO, Australian Painters on the Nature of Creativity, author John McDonald noted:

“A poster of two girls in army uniforms posed in front of the Great Wall shows how little Guo Jian actually makes up. His paintings may seem improbable but they are near reflections of Madam Mao’s Model Revolutionary Operas, and the over-the-top style of army propaganda. The message, to boys from the provinces like Guo Jian, was that beautiful girls love a man in uniform. Under capitalism or communism, sex sells.”

He highlights the implied innocence and the underlying eroticism of women used to manipulate and motivate men in uniform and in society as a whole. He delves into the sexualisation of propaganda, heroism, patriotism and persuasion. What first appears as humour is a lament at the use of sex to seduce men to war. Guo’s continual references in his paintings to his time in the P.L.A. derive from the traumatic nature of the experience. Gou recalls:

‘I used to have nightmares all the time...  Then in the library, I was looking at some pictures of China during the Cultural Revolution and I realized what was triggering these nightmares. Since coming to Australia ten years ago, I’d pushed memories of my years in the Chinese army, and of Tiananmen, out of my mind. But seeing these images triggered memories, and once I stated to use them in my paintings, I stopped having bad dreams.’”

Biography

Early life
Guo Jian 郭健 was born in 1962, in Duyun 都匀市 the capital of Qiannan Buyei and Miao Autonomous Prefecture in the autonomous prefecture of Guizhou province贵州省in Southwest China. Guizhou borders Guangxi, Yunnan, Hunan and Sichuan provinces. At 176,000 km2 (68,000 sq. ml) Guizhou is approximately the size Florida or two thirds the size of the United Kingdom. One of China's most ethnically diverse provinces; minority groups make up almost 40% of Guizhou’s population of 35 million people. Guo Jian’s family is from the Buyei 布依族 ethnic minority group.

Growing up during the Cultural Revolution (1966–1976) had a significant impact on Guo Jian’s generation. This was a period of China’s history characterized as the “Lost Decade” when the country was victim to the internal political power struggles between Mao Zedong and his more moderate opponents. The populace were subjected to a perpetual climate of intense and relentless political indoctrination, struggle sessions and community violence which created a climate of general mistrust even of neighbours and one’s own family members. More broadly, millennia of traditions, culture, society and beliefs were abandoned or destroyed as part of the Four Olds campaign.

“The depiction of soldiers has personal and political symbolism for Guo; not only was he a People’s Liberation Army soldier, but, as he has said:
‘My grandmother told me that the People’s Liberation Army had executed my grandfather.... I was shocked.... My father was a soldier. He had to denounce his own father, knowing he’d be killed too if he tried to defend him. And then in 1989, there I was, a former soldier, nearly killed by the P.L.A. myself on Tiananmen Square”  

During the 60s and 70s, as most people in China did not have access to radio information, news and government propaganda were disseminated by village big character posters loudspeakers and political posters. Emerging from this period as a young man, Guo Jian joined the PLA to escape from his country town, find his independence, and serve his country. Already an aspiring artist, he hoped to join the PLA and study at one of the army’s art colleges.

Military Experience (1979-82)
In 1978, Guo Jian was approached by the Minzu University of China, the national level university designated for ethnic minorities, but was told to wait one more year to enrol in the art department. Shortly after, PLA recruiters came to Guo Jian’s town and told him he could enter the army’s art college if he enlisted.

Guo Jian joined the PLA in 1979. One month after enlisting, he was informed that the army’s art college entry policies had changed and he could no longer automatically enter the college. As part of Deng Xiaoping’s reform policies, soldiers now had to undertake a formal entrance application process to enter military college. Guo Jian was initially assigned to the Telegraph Corps, 41st Division, 14th Corps, Yunnan Direction (the West Front) commanded by the Front Headquarter of Kunming Military Region in Kaiyuan 开远city. He was also given responsibility overseeing the armoury, and was promoted to squad leader.

His artistic interests and talents were recognised and he was assigned to a squad of “Entertainment Soldiers”  as a propaganda poster artist. During this time, (and even to the present day ) the military took visual arts, theatre and performing arts as important tools for political indoctrination, propaganda, to promote and communicate the communist party’s ideology as well as boost morale.

In 1982 Guo Jian resigned from the army and returned to his home town and worked as a propaganda officer in a local transportation company. For a period he also worked as a long-haul truck driver.

University and after (1985-92)
In 1985 Guo Jian was one of just three students accepted into Minzu University of China art department in Beijing, out of 6000 applicants who sat the entrance exam from his province alone. He initially studied traditional Chinese painting, calligraphy, and ink wash painting focussing on figurative art and eventually graduated with a Bachelor of Arts in Chinese painting and literature.

The same year, China began to open up to the world, and with it China’s “85 New Wave Movement”  of modern art began. For the first time new opportunities arose to see and study modern foreign art trends, as well as foreign political theories and philosophies.  The American artist, Robert Rauschenberg held the first officially sanctioned American art show in China in fifty years, held at Beijing’s National Art Museum of China. Rauschenberg's installation works inspired many young artists at the time.

In April 1989 the liberal ex-communist party leader Hu Yaobang died. Initially a small group of students began to commemorate his death and called for his legacy to be reassessed. Over the next few months the protesters numbers grew.

Like many students at the time, Guo Jian took part in the student protests and hunger strikes. Facing the soldiers together with the other students, he saw himself on both sides of the divide, both as a student and as the soldier. Guo Jian survived and graduated from university in July 1989, but his participation in the protest movement meant he was banned from being given employment through the formal job placement system for graduates at that time.

Guo Jian was part of the initial group of artists who moved to the outskirts of Beijing to Yuanmingyuan (the site of The Old Summer Palace ruins) and formed the Yuanmingyuan artists’ community. The artists’ move was motivated by a desire to get away from Beijing’s post 1989 restrictive environment, while being close to what was at that time a still liberal Beijing University campus.  In Yuanmingyuan Guo Jian began his professional painting career.

Leaving China (1992)
Following the Tiananmen protests and subsequent crackdown of 1989, the art sector and the overall social and political environment in Beijing and across China, remained restrictive, and conservative. As a result of pressure from the authorities, Guo Jian decided to leave China. In 1992 he immigrated to Australia. After arriving in Sydney, Guo Jian took up labouring jobs to finance himself and painted at night. His artwork gained the attention of curators and critics and his reputation grew.

In 2006, one of Australia’s leading portrait artists, Chinese Australian Shen Jiawei, included a portrait of Guo Jian entitled ‘Guo Jian and Elly’1998, in a group exhibition at the Australian Portrait Gallery in Canberra.

Back To China (2005)
Guo Jian returned to China in 2005 to explore production techniques options for developing his sculpture ‘One World One Dream’ (aka “Dirty Mind”). He resided in Songzhuang art colony East of Beijing.

In 2014 Guo Jian was interviewed on the Australian TV series "Two Men In China" about his art and his sculpture of Tianianmen Square. 
 
Subsequently, in June, 2014 Guo Jian was interviewed by Tom Mitchell, Beijing correspondent for the Financial Times newspaper. As a result of that interview, a full page story was published in the weekend edition's "Lunch with the FT" section of the Financial Times immediately prior to the June 4th anniversary. The day after the offending article in the globally distributed newspaper hit newsstands, Guo Jian was arrested by Chinese authorities at his studio  and detained for several weeks. As news of his arrest and detainment generated international news coverage Guo Jian was eventually deported to Australia for "visa issues".

Analysis and themes
The subjects and themes in Guo Jian’s work largely revolve around the relationship between entertainment and violence, aggression and lust, glamour and vice, corruption and destruction.

In her book, “Breakout - Chinese Art Outside China”, Melissa Chiu, a leading authority on Asian contemporary art, highlighted some of the prominent themes in Gou Jian’s work and their cultural and political significance:

Excitement series
“Guo’s paintings executed in Australia between 1995 and 1997 explore the sideshow theater as a site of latent violence. The main characters are soldiers being entertained by circus performers such as acrobats, knife-throwers and fire-eaters. Excitement Sideshow – Qi Gong (1995) is a good example of the cacophony of activity depicted in this series. P.L.A. soldiers, dressed in full uniform, including soft hats, are seated on both sides of the painting, providing a framing device for the performance: a woman lies on her back with her face grimacing at them while a man poised to cut her in half with a chopping knife stands by her side. This chaotic scene has many contrasts. The tension created by the performance involving knives, for example, is offset by the soldiers’ casual behavior of passing a cigarette between them during the performance.... The different layers in these paintings are metaphors for the social stratification of Chinese society, for example, between peasants, soldiers and performers.” (Chiu, 2007, P 192)

“In addition to the repetition of figures, Guo’s paintings are also redolent of figures of threat and danger. The atmosphere is always crowded and claustrophobic, creating a sense of expectation that something bad is about to happen. It derives partly from Guo’s use of the P.L.A. soldiers, which we associate with war and violence, and partly from the strong intimation of debauchery and sexual deviancy.”  (Chiu, 2007, P 194)

“Guo’s paintings from 1998 to 1999 are much more ambitious in scale and content. They include images of soldiers and generals from the P.L.A., again, but this time in front of various recognizable Chinese scenes. Excitement: Great Landscape No. I (1998), for example, is dense with nearly twenty different figures of soldiers, generals, women (some naked and some wearing underwear) and men in everyday clothes populating a landscape of mountains and a bathing pool. If we focus on the right hand side of the painting alone, we see a woman in red underwear eating chocolate ice cream, a soldier on a rocking horse (painted black and white), a woman bathing naked in the pool with her breasts exposed the water, and a man in green shorts poised to dive off a mountain peak into the water. These figures don’t engage with one another at all, and their scale in the landscape is not pictorially correct, at least according to the principles of linear perspective, since some are oversized while others appear miniaturized by comparison. The layering of imagery is reminiscent of collage techniques, with the foreground figures sitting uneasily against the background landscape. This is intentional, used by the artist to convey the utter artificiality of the scene - a world controlled by corrupt and debauched P.L.A., officers and Party officials. By showing the army soldiers without their uniforms, Gou further disrupts the authority invested in them.”  (Chiu, 2007, P 194)

“Guo’s Excitement: Great Tiananmen (1998) from the same series is an even more potent caricature of the P.L.A., portraying soldiers and generals as immoral and ineffectual. Against the backdrop of the gate of Tiananmen, Guo fills the painting with a mass of figures. To the right hand side, groups of soldiers congregate together with the cigarettes in their hands, as if posing for a photograph, a common site at Tiananmen Square. Their image is painted in black and white, like an old photograph, perhaps a reference to the past. The seeming innocence of these young soldiers is contrasted against the violent acts of other soldiers around them. In the upper right-side corner, of example, three soldiers hold a man’s arms and neck, restraining him so that he can’t move, while in the center of the work another soldier pins a naked man to the ground. A black official car with Deng Xiaoping standing up and through the sunroof runs over a naked man. Although the men in this painting are mostly soldiers, the women are shown to be the temptresses who are either naked or wearing red lace underwear and remnants of army uniforms, cavorting recklessly with the soldiers. A fighter plane flies low across the Square amid the small air explosions that resemble anti-aircraft fire. Gou’s Excitement: Great Tiananmen is a strange assemblage of erotic and violent acts, united only by the themes of disorder and conflict. This painting is a statement on the decay and corruption of the P.L.A., made all the more pointed by the inclusion of poppy flowers in the foreground – a reference to the drug industry in China.(Chiu, 2007, P 194)

The Day Before I Went Away series

“One of the few respites from the cycle of propaganda and exercise was the occasional visit of singers and dancers brought in to perform for troops before they headed to war – a heightened experience for these groups of agitated, isolated young men. In the series of satirical paintings “The Day before I went Away” (2008), Guo Jian offers impressions of how young woman were positioned by the army in these covertly erotic performances to manipulate the soldiers to the point of sexual hysteria and blood lust.”  

The PLA’s Entertainment Soldiers, also known ‘Military Performing Troupes’, ‘Song and Dance Troupes’ or ‘Military Art Troupes’  were initially recognised by Mao Zedong as an important element of ‘art as a form of media’ which was one of the most effective forms of propaganda.  For Mao “revolution was art; art was revolution”, and art as a form of mass media was possibly one of the most effective and long lasting impressions that could be left on a people, and was left on the Chinese people.

From the earliest days of China’s civil war in the 1930s through to current times, these performance troupes have served to romanticize ideals of the communist party’s struggle. As of 2013 Chinese government employed 10,000 military troupe performers in thirty PLA troupe groups.

Among the most famous and important entertainment soldiers are; Song Zuying (宋祖英) is known as "mother of communist China”. In 1991, she joined the PLA Naval Song and Dance Troupe as a national first-class singer. As of 2009, she was a non-combatant rear admiral in China’s Naval Song and Dance Troupe. She was widely rumoured to have been the long-time mistress of Jiang Zemin, the General Secretary of Communist Party of China from 1989 to 2002; Peng Liyuan (彭麗媛) born 1962, is a Chinese contemporary folk singer and performing artist. She joined the PLA in 1980 when she was 18 and began as an ordinary soldier, but with her vocal talent later performed during frontline tours to boost troop morale during the Sino-Vietnamese border conflicts. She is the wife of China’s current paramount leader and head of state Xi Jinping, and as such referred to as the "Chinese First Lady" by American and Chinese media. Prior to Xi Jinping becoming leader, his wife was far more famous in China than her husband. She holds the civilian rank equivalent to major general; Li Shuangjiang (李双江) a Chinese tenor and a Major-General in the PLA’s Naval Song and Dance Troupe. He sold three million albums when he was thirty-two years old.

Trigger Happy series
Guo’s more recent works are based on the Red Detachment of Women, a Cultural Revolution ballet of a battle between evil landowners and good Communist soldiers. The composition of this series of paintings, titled “Trigger Happy”, is more formal and structured than in previous works. Trigger Happy XI (2000), for example features a line of almost identical women leaning forward with their hands on their knees, gazing directly at the viewer. They wear nothing but army helmets as a kind of superficial protection against an airplane on fire, nose-diving toward the ground in the distance. In front of them, a ballerina from the Red Detachment of Women, wearing an army uniform of blue shirt and shorts, performs an arabesque on ballet pointed-shoes with her arms out-stretched, holding a red kerchief and a gun in her right hand. The contrasts between the naked women and the ballerina suggests a tension between two stereotypes of women (the seductress and the dutiful women) as well as past and present perceptions of the P.L.A....  In a further comment upon the current status of the P.L.A., Guo included in the painting a male soldier crouched on the ground clutching a gun. He wears only green underpants and a metal helmet, yet his body is covered in perspiration. His mouth is open and smiling and his eyes are half-closed, as if aroused.  p. 196

Red Detachment of Women 红色娘子军 is an iconic Chinese ballet premiered in 1964 and was one of the Eight Model Operas that dominated the national stage during the Cultural Revolution. It is best known in the West as the ballet performed for President Richard Nixon on his visit to China in February 1972. In 2013, the National Ballet of China performed it at the Theatre du Chatelet in Paris, together with Swan Lake. In 2014 the ballet was performed during the (China Central Television) CCTV Chinese New Year Gala, to an TV audience of 750 million people.

Key collections
2013	1979 2010, oil on canvas 50 x 60 cm collection of Professor David Robert Walker the Australian academic historian.  
2011	Study for The Day Before I Went Away 2010 acrylic on canvas 160 x 140 cm collection of Geoff Raby former Australian ambassador to China 2007–2011
2010	The Day Before I Went Away 2008 oil on canvas 150 x 100 cm collection of Lucy Turnbull (wife of Australian politician Malcolm Turnbull) Lord Mayor of Sydney Australia 2003–04 
2010   I like the Blue Sea 2010 oil on canvas 182 x 300 cm collection of Robert Wilks Melbourne Australia
2010   One World One Dream aka Dirty Mind 2004 resin glass 110 x 70 cm x 70 cm collection of Geoff Raby former Australian ambassador to China 2007–2011
2008	The Day Before I Went Away 2008 oil on canvas 152 x 213 cm Queensland Gallery of Modern Art (GoMA), Brisbane, Australia 
2007	Excitement Sideshow – Qigong 1997 oil on canvas 116 x 92 cm collection of Robert Wilks Melbourne Australia
2004	Self portrait 2003 oil on canvas 160 x 140 cm collection of Thomas Berghuis (curator at the Solomon R. Guggenheim Museum, New York) 
2003	Gangsters Paradise 2003 oil on canvas, 160 x 140 cm Casula Powerhouse Liverpool Sydney Australia 
2002	Bubbles of Yum/Girls of Romance 2002 oil on canvas 117 x 132 cm collection of Robert Wilks Melbourne Australia
2002   The Day before I Went Away #4 2002 oil on canvas 152 x 213 cm ‘Bokchoy Tang Restaurant’, Federation Square, Flinders St, Melbourne Australia
2000	Trigger Happy 2000 oil on canvas 152 x 213 cm, Collection Nonda Katsalidis, Melbourne Australia
2000   Trigger Happy II 1999 oil on canvas 146 x 198 cm collection of Denis Moriarty and Brendan Shanahan, Melbourne Australia  
2000   Trigger Happy XI 2000 oil on canvas 136 x 119 cm collection of Dan Sutter, Sydney Australia
2000   Excitement, Great Landscape No 1 1998 oil on canvas 122 x 200 cm Collection of Magistrate Gail Madgwick Sydney Australia
2001	Wet Dreams 1999 oil on canvas 177 x 132 cm collection of Beau Neilson White Rabbit Gallery Sydney Australia
1999	Cruising 1999 oil on canvas 146 x 198 cm National Gallery of Australia, Canberra 
1999   Trigger Happy IX 1999 oil on canvas 180 x 200 cm National Gallery of Australia, Canberra 
1999   National Anthem 1999 oil on canvas 146 x 197 cm collection of Sam Neill New Zealand 
1999   Trigger Happy 1999 oil on canvas 146 x 198 cm collection of Sam Neill Sydney Australia
1998	Big Screen 1996 oil on canvas 145 x 198 cm 37th Fisher’s Ghost Festival Art Award, Joint Winner Open Section Campbelltown City Bicentennial Art Gallery Australia

Private collections in China, Hong Kong, Mexico, Sweden, Belgium, France, New Zealand, Australia and USA

Commissions
2011	Portrait acrylic on canvas 160 x 140 cm commissioned by Geoff Raby former Australian Ambassador to China 2007–2011
2010	I like the Blue Sea oil on canvas 180 x 300 cm commissioned by Robert Wilks Melbourne Australia 
2010   Excitement 95 x 145 cm commissioned by Ken West Founder of Big Day Out music festival Melbourne Australia 
2009   Portrait of Michelle 180 x 300 cm oil on canvas – commissioned by Robert Wilks Melbourne Australia
2000–2006	Trigger Happy and Great Tiananmen enlarged print reproductions used as backdrop for main stage of Big Day Out music festival Melbourne, Sydney, Brisbane Australia; Auckland New Zealand 
2002	Gilberson – Revolution, Artwork used as backdrop and theme of the band’s MTV music video clip
2001 	Trigger Happy Visible Arts Foundation Installation Art Project, Republic Tower, for Nonda Katsalidis, Melbourne, Australia

Exhibitions

Solo exhibitions
2012     	Guo Jian, Burwood Gallery, Sydney Australia 
2010     	The Cast And Crew, 4A Center for Contemporary Asian Art, Sydney Australia
2009     	New Works by Guo Jian, Arc One Gallery, Melbourne, Australia 
2007     	New Works by Guo Jian, Galerie Anne Lettree, Paris, France
2006     	New Works by Guo Jian, Arc One Gallery, Melbourne, Australia 
2005     	New Works by Guo Jian, Michael Reid gallery, Sydney, Australia
2002     	Bubbles of Yum, Ray Hughes Gallery, Sydney, Australia
2001     	Mama’s Trippin’, Heidi Museum of Modern Art, Melbourne, Australia
2000     	Mama’s Trippin, Canberra Contemporary Art Space, Gorman House, Canberra, Australia
1999     	Trigger Happy, Ray Hughes Gallery, Sydney, Australia
1998	Double Happiness is a Warm Gun, Tin Sheds Gallery, University of Sydney, Australia
1994    	Little Bastards, Headspace Gallery, Sydney, Australia

Selected group exhibitions
2013	First China - ASEAN Art Biennale, Nanning, Guangxi Zhuang Autonomous Region China   
2013   We: 1994–2013 – The 20th Anniversary Collective Exhibition of China Songzhuang Artists, Songzhuang Art Gallery, Beijing China
2013   Not A Stranger, 2013 China Songzhuang Foreign Artists Works Show, Songzhuang Huandao Gallery, Beijing China
2012 	First Contemporary Art Show Of Weibo, Songzhuang Art Gallery, Songzhuang Art Colony, Beijing China     	
2012   Today – Collective Exhibition, Songzhuang Four Times Art Museum, Beijing China
2010    DHZ (dehistoricalised zone) Contemporary Art Centre of South Australia, Adelaide Australia       
2010   Crossover Songzhuang Art Festival Australian part, Beijing China 
2009	The China Project, Queensland Gallery of Modern Art (GoMA), Brisbane, Australia 
2008 	From MAO TO NOW, Armory Gallery, Newington Armory, Sydney, Australia 
2008   50X50 SUMMER SHOW, Arc One Gallery, Melbourne, Australia 
2008   Songzhuang Dreamtime, Songzhuang, Beijing China
2008   Chinese Voices Chinese Stories, OSAGE, Hong Kong
2008   Southern Skies Chinese Artists In Australia, The Australian Embassy, Beijing, China
2008   The Converted Image, DAX Art Space, Beijing, China
2008   China Project, Galeriaomr O M R, Mexico City, Mexico[26]
2007 	Backbone Strength, Arts Mansion, Beijing, China
2006	Guo Jian, Arc One Gallery, Melbourne Australia
2004 	ARTV, Australian Centre for the Moving Image & SBS, Melbourne Australia
2004   Sulman Prize, Art Gallery Of New South Wales, Sydney, Australia
2003	Liverpool Art Prize, Liverpool, NSW, Australia
2003   Bendigo Art Prize, Bendigo, Vic, Australia
2003   Group Show January, Ray Hughes Gallery, Sydney, Australia
2002	Sir John Sulman Prize, Art Gallery Of New South Wales, Sydney, Australia
2002   The Year In Art Exhibition, S H Ervin Gallery, Sydney, Australia
2002   Guo Jian, Bubbles of Yum, Ray Hughes Gallery, Sydney Australia
2000	Australian Drawing Biennale, Drill Hall, Australian National University, Canberra, Australia
2000   Contemporary Australian Art, Musee De Picardie, Amiens, France
2000   Thinking Aloud...A Drawing Show, Ray Hughes Gallery, Sydney, Australia
2000   Chinese Australian Art, National Gallery of Australia, Canberra, Australia
1998	Beyond China, Campbelltown City Bicentennial Art Gallery, Sydney, Australia 
1997	3 X 3 Demonstration Art, Sydney, Australia
1996	3 X 3 (Video), Touring Berlin, Germany & Auckland, New Zealand
1992	Yuanmingyan Artists Exhibition, Brussels Art Festival, Belgium
1992   Forest Art Exhibition, Beijing, China
1991	Yuanmingyuan Art, Goethe Institute, Dayuan Guesthouse, Beijing, China
1991   Studio 149, Yuanmingyuan, Beijing, China 
1990	Paintings Of Guo Jian And Zhang Ge, Beijing Art Gallery & Beijing 
1990   Friendship Hotel, Beijing, China 
1988 	China Central Minorities Institute Selection, China Art Gallery, Beijing, China 
1981	Provincial Military Art Exhibition, Yunan, China

References

External links

 Guo Jian - official web site

Australian contemporary artists
Chinese contemporary artists
Painters from Guizhou
1962 births
Living people
Bouyei people